The following is a list of players and who appeared in at least one game for the St. Louis Maroons/Indianapolis Hoosiers franchise of the Union Association ( and National League ( through ).



A
Billy Alvord
Varney Anderson
Ed Andrews
Tug Arundel

B
George Baker
Charley Bassett
Al Bauer
Henry Boyle
Jack Brennan
Fatty Briody
Tom Brown
Dick Buckley
Bill Burdick
Dick Burns

C
John Cahill
Ed Callahan
Ed Caskin
John Cattanach
Red Connally
Larry Corcoran
Sam Crane
Dan Cronin

D
Con Daily
Hugh Daily
Jerry Denny
Buttercup Dickerson
Tom Dolan
Fred Dunlap

E
Dude Esterbrook

F
Jack Fanning
Frederick Fass
Jack Fee
John Fogarty

G
Gid Gardner
Charlie Getzien
Jack Glasscock
Jack Gleason
Frank Graves

H
Mert Hackett
John Healy
Paul Hines
Charlie Hodnett

I

J
Henry Jackson
Bill Johnson

K
John Kirby
Charlie Krehmeyer
Gus Krock

L
Doc Leitner
Fred Lewis

M
George Mappes
C. V. Matteson
Jack McGeachey
Alex McKinnon
Trick McSorley
Sam Moffet
Hank Morrison
Joe Murphy
George Myers

N

O

P
Billy Palmer
Louis Pelouze
Dick Phelan
Mark Polhemus

Q
Joe Quinn

R
Jeremiah Reardon
Dave Rowe
Amos Rusie
Tom Ryder

S
Jumbo Schoeneck
Otto Schomberg
Emmett Seery
Orator Shaffer
Lev Shreve
Andy Sommers
John Sowders
Marty Sullivan
Sleeper Sullivan
William Sullivan
Sy Sutcliffe
Charlie Sweeney
Rooney Sweeney

T
Billy Taylor

U

V

W
Pete Weckbecker
Perry Werden
Milt Whitehead
Jim Whitney

X

Y

Z

External links
Maroons at Baseball Reference
Hoosiers at Baseball Reference

Major League Baseball all-time rosters